Mountain patrol may refer to:

Kekexili: Mountain Patrol, a 2004 Chinese film
Ski patrol, an organization that provides first aid and rescue services to skiers and participants of other snow sports